The 1980 United States presidential election in Arizona took place on November 4, 1980. All fifty states and The District of Columbia were part of the 1980 United States presidential election. State voters chose six electors to the Electoral College, who voted for president and vice president.

Arizona was won by former California Governor Ronald Reagan by a landslide of 32%. This result left the state 22.62% more Republican than the nation at-large, a differential greater even than when Barry Goldwater narrowly won his home state during his 1964 landslide defeat, and the most Republican relative to the nation at-large Arizona has ever been since statehood in 1912. Reagan's victory margin was at the time the largest by a Republican, though he would beat his own record four years later. Only Franklin D. Roosevelt in 1932 and 1936 has won Arizona by a larger margin, whilst Carter's share of the popular vote remains the worst ever by a Democrat in the Grand Canyon State.

Reagan won every county except heavily unionized Greenlee, which would never vote Republican until 2000, in the process duplicating the state's 1972 county map. This stands as the last election when predominantly Native American Apache County has supported the Republican nominee.

Carter's insensitivity to essential issues in the West, especially water development, ensured he would be comfortably beaten in this normally solidly Republican state, which had been the only state no Democrat carried during the dealigned 1960s and 1970s.

Primaries

Results

Results by county

References

Arizona
1980
1980 Arizona elections